Cheonsa Misonyeo (Korean 천사 미소녀; also marketed in Chinese Pinyin: Tiānshǐ Měishàonǚ, Japanese: Tenshi Bishōjo, English: Angel Prettygirl) is a Korean language pop album by Taiwanese singer/actress/model Vivian Hsu, released October 10, 1996 on the SAMPONY label. It is Vivian's first and, only foray into the Korean language. It is also by far the rarest of Vivian's solo albums.

Some of the tracks are Korean translations of songs from her first album, 天使想 (py. Tiānshǐ Xiǎng, jp. Tenshi Sou, en. Angel Dreaming), while others are originals.

Track listing
"Sea ～ 情人" – 4:29 (pinyin: Qíngrén, English: Sweetheart)
"I'll Follow You" – 4:19
"The Moon Shadow" – 4:19
"Together" – 4:00
"Tears" – 4:23
"Goodbye My Love" – 4:25
"Goodbye Day" – 3:53
"Sea ～ 情人 (Instrumental)" – 4:29

Release details

Vivian Hsu albums
1996 albums